Udaipurwati Assembly constituency is one of constituencies of Rajasthan Legislative Assembly in the Jhunjhunu (Lok Sabha constituency).

Udaipurwati Constituency covers all voters from Udaipurwati tehsil.

political story
The full story of Udaipurwati MLA Rajendra Singh Gudha's political journey

Rajendra Singh Gudha, who started his political journey from the year 2008, may not come from a political family, but Gudha's brother Ranveer Singh Gudha was once the student union president from Rajasthan University (year 1998-1999) and once MLA from Udaipurwati assembly seat (years). 2009) has lived. However, there is a rift between the two brothers. The story of the crack is also interesting, which will be told again today, today it is about the political journey of Rajendra Singh Gudha.

In the year 2003, Ranveer Singh Gudha, brother of Rajendra Singh Gudha became MLA from Udaipurwati, but due to the rift between the two brothers, Rajendra Gudha also entered politics and due to this Ranveer Singh Gudha made distance from his political land Udaipurwati. In the 2008 Rajasthan Assembly elections, Rajendra Singh Gudha entered the fray on a BSP ticket and was contesting from Congress's Vijendra Singh Inderpura, independent Ravindra Singh Bhadana, independent Ram Niwas Saini and BJP's Madanlal Saini. Madanlal Saini, who has been the state president of Rajasthan BJP and independent Ram Niwas Saini, who is currently in the court of Rajendra Singh Gudha and is the chairman from Udaipurwati. Elections were held and when the results came, this Rajendra Singh Gudha won from Congress's Vijendra Singh Inderpura by a margin of about 8,000 votes.

In 2008 Udaipurwati assembly elections, Rajendra Singh Gudha got 28,478 votes and Congress's Vijender Singh Inderpura got 20,641 votes, Independent Ravindra Singh Bhadana got 17,521 votes, BJP's Madanlal Saini got 10,388 votes and Independent Ram Niwas Saini got 8,581 votes. The margin of victory in this election was 7,837 votes.

After winning the 2008 assembly elections, Rajendra Singh Gudha left the BSP and went to the Congress and Rajendra Gudha was made a minister of state in the Ashok Gehlot government at that time.

 Rajendra Singh Gudha, Minister of State, Government of Rajasthan and MLA of Udaipurwati
2013 Udaipurwati Assembly Elections
In the year 2013 Rajasthan assembly elections, Congress party fielded Rajendra Singh Gudha as its candidate from Udaipurwati assembly seat and this time Rajendra Gudha was contesting from BJP's Shubhkaran Choudhary and independent Ravindra Singh Bhadana. There was a Modi wave in the whole of India and the BJP government was to be formed in Rajasthan according to political mathematics, so Rajendra Singh Gudha lost this election to Shubhkaran Chaudhary of BJP by a margin of about 11 thousand votes.

In the 2013 Udaipurwati Assembly elections, BJP's Shubhkaran Choudhary got 57,960 votes, Congress's Rajendra Singh Gudha got 46,089 votes and independent Ravindra Singh Bhadana got 32,556 votes. The margin of victory in this election was 11,871 votes.

2018 Udaipurwati Assembly Elections
After losing the 2013 assembly elections, Congress cut Rajendra Singh Gudha's ticket in the 2018 Rajasthan Assembly elections and Rajendra Gudha again entered the electoral fray on the BSP ticket like in the year 2008 and this time the contest was from BJP's Shubhkaran Chaudhary and Congress. It happened to Lord Ram Saini. In a triangular contest, Rajendra Singh Gudha won this election by a margin of about 6000 votes over BJP's Shubhkaran Choudhary.

In the 2018 Udaipurwati Assembly elections, Rajendra Singh Gudha of BSP got 59,362 votes, Shubhkaran Choudhary of BJP got 53,828 votes and Bhagwan Ram Saini of Congress got 52,633 votes. The margin of victory in this election was 5,534 votes.

After winning the elections from the BSP ticket, he again went to the court of Congress like the year 2008 and the Ashok Gehlot government of Congress again made Rajendra Singh Gudha a minister of state.

The answers to the questions that you want to know about Udaipurwati MLA Rajendra Singh Gudha?

Biography of Rajendra Singh Gudha

Born on July 19, 1968, in Udaipurwati, Rajendra Singh Gudha became an MLA for the first time in the year 2008 on a BSP ticket, after which won the elections for the second time on a BSP ticket in 2018 and then joined the Congress.

Who is Rajendra Singh Gudha?

Rajendra Singh Gudha is a Minister of State in the Government of Rajasthan and has been MLA from Udaipurwati Assembly seat twice.

Rajendra Singh Gudha's family

Rajendra Singh Gudha's son Shivam Gudha is also currently active in politics.

References

See also 
 Member of the Legislative Assembly (India)

Jhunjhunu district
Assembly constituencies of Rajasthan